Olga Bjoner  (10 December 1887 – 25 June 1969) was a Norwegian journalist, organizational leader and Nazi politician. She was born in Askim.

She chaired Norges Bondekvinnelag in the 1920s and 1930s. During the occupation of Norway by Nazi Germany she chaired Nasjonal Samling's organization for women.

References

External links

1887 births
1969 deaths
People from Askim
Members of Nasjonal Samling
People convicted of treason for Nazi Germany against Norway
Norwegian prisoners and detainees
Norwegian women in World War II